Deadtime Stories (also known internationally as Freaky Fairy-Tales and The Griebels from Deadtime Stories) is a 1986 American horror comedy anthology film co-written and directed by Jeffery Delman in his directorial debut. In the film, a babysitting uncle tells his nephew three stories. The first story involves a slave used by two witches, who are attempting to resurrect their sister. The second story is based on "Little Red Riding Hood", where a teenage girl mistakenly picks up a werewolf's medicine for her grandmother. The third story, based on "Goldilocks", tells about three escaped mental patients who share their hideaway with a murderess.

Production was filmed in New York City in 1984, originally titled as Freaky Fairy Tales. After screening at the 1986 Cannes Film Festival, it was released on November 26, 1986, where it grossed $2.7 million at the box office.

Plot
An impatient uncle attempts to calm his rambunctious nephew by telling him three horror stories. The first story tells about a fisherman's son who is sold as a slave to two witches that are trying to resurrect their sister. The second story is about a teenage girl who picks up the medication for her grandmother, which is mixed up with medicine intended for a werewolf. In the third story, three mental patients escape and share their country house hideaway with a murderess.

Cast

Scott Valentine as Peter
Nicole Picard as Rachel
Matt Mitler as Willie
Cathryn de Prume as Goldi Lox
Melissa Leo as Judith "MaMa" Baer
Kathy Fleig as Miranda
Phyllis Craig as Hanagohl
Michael Mesmer as Uncle Mike
Brian DePersia as Little Brian
Kevin Hannon as Beresford "Papa" Baer
Timothy Rule as Wilmont "Baby" Baer
Anne Redfern as Florinda
Casper Roos as Vicar
Barbara Seldon as Seductress
Leigh Kilton as Seductress
Lesley Sank as Reviving Magoga
Lisa Cain as Living Magoga
Jeffrey Delman as Strangling Man
Michael Berlinger as Greg
Fran Lopate as Grandma
John Bachelder as Drugstore Clerk
Caroline Carrigan as Nurse
Oded Carmi as Groundskeeper / Postman
Heather L. Baley as Girl in Store
Thea as Dog
Bob Trimboli as Lt. Jack B. Nimble
Harvey Pierce as Capt. Jack B. Quick
Rondell Sheridan as Looney Bin Guard
Beth Felty as Reporter
Patrick McCord as Anchor
Michele Mars as Waitress
Ron Bush as Bank Guard
Bryant Tausek as Man At Car
Suzanna Vaucher as Weather Girl
Leif Wennestrom as Dead Body
Jim Nocell as Dead Body
Evan L. Delman as Police Sergeant

Production
Principal photography was shot as Freaky Fairy Tales in New York City in 1984, and finished post-production in 1985. The title was initially changed to Deadtime, but was settled as Deadtime Stories.

Release
Deadtime Stories was screened at the 1986 Cannes Film Festival. After being acquired, the film was released on November 26, 1986 in the Southeastern United States, and premiered in Los Angeles on February 20, 1987. It earned $708,112 on its opening weekend in 255 theaters, and grossed $2.7 million during its theatrical course.

Home video
It was originally released on VHS in 1987 by Continental Video and Magnum Entertainment in the United States, and by Entertainment in Video in the United Kingdom where it was titled as Freaky Fairy-Tales. Mill Creek Entertainment released the film on DVD on September 13, 2015 as part of their ‘Chilling Classics: 50 Movie Pack’, but was discontinued after it was mistaken to be in the public domain. The film was released again on DVD by Image Entertainment under license from Cinevision International, which ran 12 minutes shorter. Scream Factory, a substinary of Shout! Factory, released Deadtime Stories on Blu-ray and DVD as a combo pack on February 28, 2017.

References

External links

  

1980s comedy horror films
1986 fantasy films
1986 independent films
1980s monster movies
1980s supernatural films
1986 films
Films shot in New York City
1986 horror films
American parody films
Fairy tale parody films
American comedy horror films
American horror anthology films
American independent films
American supernatural horror films
American dark fantasy films
Supernatural fantasy films
Supernatural comedy films
Films about witchcraft
Films based on Little Red Riding Hood
Films based on multiple works
Films based on short fiction
Films based on Goldilocks and the Three Bears
American werewolf films
1986 comedy films
1980s English-language films
1980s American films
English-language comedy horror films